JK is a 2006 Brazilian television series created by Maria Adelaide Amaral and Alcides Nogueira, based on the biography of former president of Brazil Juscelino Kubitschek.

Plot 
JK tells the history Juscelino Kubitschek's life, from poor childhood in Diamantina, Minas Gerais, through the ascension to the position of President of Brazil, until his death in an auto accident in 1976.

Cast

References

External links 
 Official website 

Rede Globo original programming
Brazilian television miniseries
2006 Brazilian television series debuts
2006 Brazilian television series endings
Vargas Era